Naomi Osaka defeated Serena Williams in the final, 6–2, 6–4 to win the women's singles tennis title at the 2018 US Open. She became the first Japanese player to win a major singles title. She lost only one set during the tournament, to Aryna Sabalenka in the fourth round. Following the win, Osaka also made her top 10 rankings debut. Williams was attempting to equal Margaret Court's all-time record of 24 major singles titles, and to set a new Open Era record by winning a seventh US Open singles title.

Sloane Stephens was the defending champion, but lost to Anastasija Sevastova in the quarterfinals.

Simona Halep's first-round loss to Kaia Kanepi marked the first time in the Open Era that the top seed lost in the first round. The losses of Halep in the first round and second seed Caroline Wozniacki in the second round marked the first time that the top two seeds failed to reach the third round, and the second time this happened at any major in the Open Era (following the 2014 French Open).

This marked the final major appearance for former world No. 2 and 2015 WTA Finals champion Agnieszka Radwańska, who lost in the first round to Tatjana Maria.

Seeds

Qualifying

Draw

Finals

Top half

Section 1

Section 2

Section 3

Section 4

Bottom half

Section 5

Section 6

Section 7

Section 8

Statistics

References

External links
 Women's Singles main draw
2018 US Open – Women's draws and results at the International Tennis Federation

US Open (tennis) by year – Women's singles
Women's Singles
US Open – Women's Singles
US Open - Women's Singles